Dorian Babunski Hristovski (born 29 August 1996) is a Macedonian professional footballer who plays as a centre-forward for Hungarian club Debrecen.

Club career
Born in Skopje, Macedonia, Dorian joined Real Madrid's youth setup in 2011, after representing  Gramanet and UE Cornellà. On 1 October 2015, he signed a free contract with Fuenlabrada, but was released in June 2016. Two months later, he signed a three-year contract with Olimpija Ljubljana.

In February 2017, he was signed by Radomlje on loan.

Personal life
Babunski's father, Boban, was also a footballer, and played in several countries, including Spain. His brother, David, is also a footballer.

References

External links
 

 PrvaLiga profile 

1996 births
Living people
Footballers from Skopje
Association football forwards
Macedonian footballers
North Macedonia under-21 international footballers
CF Fuenlabrada footballers
NK Olimpija Ljubljana (2005) players
NK Radomlje players
FC Machida Zelvia players
FC Botev Vratsa players
Debreceni VSC players
Kagoshima United FC players
Segunda División B players
Slovenian PrvaLiga players
J2 League players
J3 League players
Nemzeti Bajnokság I players
Macedonian expatriate footballers
Expatriate footballers in Spain
Macedonian expatriate sportspeople in Spain
Expatriate footballers in Slovenia
Macedonian expatriate sportspeople in Slovenia
Expatriate footballers in Japan
Macedonian expatriate sportspeople in Japan
Expatriate footballers in Bulgaria
Macedonian expatriate sportspeople in Bulgaria
Expatriate footballers in Hungary
Macedonian expatriate sportspeople in Hungary